Gravity of Light is the eighth studio album by the Finnish heavy metal band Tarot. It was released in Finland on 10 March 2010, in Europe on 23 April 2010 and in the US on 8 June 2010.

Track listing 

 "Satan Is Dead" – 4:12
 "Hell Knows" – 6:05
 "Rise!" – 4:30
 "Pilot of All Dreams" – 3:42
 "Magic and Technology" – 5:48
 "Calling Down the Rain" – 4:11
 "Caught in the Deadlights" – 4:41
 "I Walk Forever" – 4:49
 "Sleep in the Dark" – 4:41
 "Gone" – 7:03
 "End of Everything" (bonus track) – 03:48

Singles 
 "I Walk Forever" (digital only)

Charts

Credits 
Marko Hietala – vocals & backing vocals, bass, acoustic guitar
Zachary Hietala – guitars
Janne Tolsa – keyboards
Pecu Cinnari – drums
Tommi Salmela – samples, vocals & backing vocals

References 

2010 albums
Tarot (band) albums